Boophis schuboeae is a species of frog in the family Mantellidae.

It is endemic to Madagascar, known only from Ranomafana National Park but it may occur more widespread.

Its natural habitats are subtropical or tropical moist lowland forests and rivers.
It is threatened by habitat loss for agriculture, timber extraction, charcoal manufacturing, invasive eucalyptus, livestock grazing and expanding human settlement.

References

schuboeae
Endemic frogs of Madagascar
Amphibians described in 2002
Taxonomy articles created by Polbot